Fashion for Relief is a charitable organization founded in 2005 that has raised funds for various environmental and humanitarian causes.  In 2005, Naomi Campbell  founded two charities, "We love Brazil" and Fashion for Relief. Campbell invites high-profile individuals from fashion, film, music, and television industries to participate in shows. The fashion shows have been hosted and recycle venues in Cannes, Dar es Salaam, London, Moscow, Mumbai and New York City. In 2005, the London-based non-profit organization CARE hosted Fashion for Relief, donating to international charitable organizations to bring aid to people in crises in various countries. Since 2012, the online retailer YOOX has partnered with Fashion for Relief. In 2015, the popularity of FFR events, Campbell applied for non-profit status in United Kingdom.

Runway Celebrities 
 Tyson Beckford
 Justin Bieber
 Naomi Campbell
 Jourdan Dunn
 Sarah Ferguson
 Jane Fonda
 Toni Garrn
Brad Goreski
 Paris Hilton
 Kate Moss
 Kelly Osbourne
 Alexandra Richards
 Nicole Richie
 Michelle Rodriguez
 Cheyenne Tozzi
 Kendall Jenner
 Heidi Klum
 Gigi Hadid
 Bella Hadid
Natalia Vodianova

Fellowship Award 
 2017 - Queen Rania Al Abdullah

Relief Causes 

 2005 – Hurricane Katrina

 2007 – British Summer Floods

 2008 – Whitechapel Mission

 2009 – White Ribbon’s Alliance – Tanzania; Citizens for Justice and Peace (Mumbai)

 2010 – White Ribbon’s Alliance – Haiti
2011 – Japan Red Cross – earthquake and tsunami
2012 – Udayan Care – India
2013 – Typhoon Haiyan – Philippines
2015 – Disasters Emergency Committee – Ebola
2017 - Refugee Children - Cannes
2018 - Time's Up Race to Equality, #MeToo movement and Save the Children - Cannes 
2019 - Mayor's Fund for London - London
2020-2021 - COVID-19 online campaign
2022 - UNICEF - London

References 

Charities based in the United Kingdom
Fashion organizations
Women's organisations based in the United Kingdom